Karen Frances McCarthy is a published author, teacher, former political journalist, and progressive Spiritualist medium. She was born in Dublin, Ireland. She has a master's degree from University College Dublin, is a graduate of the London School of Journalism, and has three Certificates of Recognition from the Arthur Findlay College, a school of spiritualism and psychic sciences. She is currently a PhD Candidate at the University of Birmingham, a world top 100 university and member of the prestigious Russell Group, where she is researching postsecular ghost literature. She is the sister of Irish Olympian Earl McCarthy.

Political writing

Journalism

As a journalist, McCarthy began covering US politics for a variety of newspapers, including Irish Examiner. and the Riz Khan Show on Al Jazeera English. In 2007, she was an embedded reporter in Iraq. She was one of the first to write about Sunni Awakening Councils in Anbar Province, Al Qaeda HQ in Baqubah, for The Irish Times.

Television

In 2006, McCarthy wrote and produced Made in America for RTÉ in Ireland, about the challenges and triumphs of the human spirit of four young Irish people who emigrated to the US in the early 1990s on the eve of the signing of the Good Friday Agreement that changed the economic and political climate of Ireland. The series was nominated for an Irish Film & Television Academy Award for Best Documentary Series.

Books

The Other Irish

In 2010, McCarthy's first book The Other Irish was published by Sterling Publishing Inc. For this work, she was named one of Ireland's top female broadcasters who have had an international impact. The book was supported by Ireland's Department of Foreign Affairs as part of the country's Reconciliation and Anti-Sectarian Fund as a cultural outreach project. The announcement of support for these projects was made on 28 November 2012.

Northern Ireland is still a very divided society. We saw the potential for sectarian activity to flare up again this summer, so it's clear that, despite the enormous progress made since the Good Friday Agreement was signed, great challenges remain. We are supporting these projects to help overcome the problem of sectarianism and to promote reconciliation in Northern Ireland as well as strengthening community relations across the island of Ireland. I am grateful to the groups and individuals who carry out this critical work. It remains as important as ever that we support their efforts.

As part of the reconciliation effort, McCarthy travelled throughout Ireland, talking to various Protestant communities, including the Ulster Scots Agency, the Public Records Office of Northern Ireland, the Linen Hall Library, and the Monreagh Heritage Centre. It was also supported in the media by Ian Adamson, OBE, and William Humphrey DUP MLA in the Belfast Telegraph. She appeared on RTÉ's History Show with Miles Dungan, NPR with Kathleen Dunn, the BBC's Saturday Morning Radio Show with John Toal. The book was reviewed favourably by the Huffington Post, and by Prof. James Flannery of Emory College for the Irish America Magazine.

Spiritual writing

Journalism

In 2011, McCarthy stopped covering politics and began to contribute features articles on spirituality, existential belief systems and philosophy of religion for Salon, Huffington Post Religion Beliefnet, the Belfast Media, and The Irish Voice.

Television

McCarthy worked with Deepak Chopra to produce TV shows based on Chopra's books Alchemy and The Crystal Cave. Martin Sheen as Arthur, Robert Guillaume as Merlin, and Johanna Cassidy as the narrator offered a dramatic reading designed to teach those seeking a deeper meaning in their lives that they may locate wisdom by seeking their "inner wizard."

Books

Till Death Don't Us Part

In 2011, McCarthy had what she has described as an awakening. In 2020, she described the events leading up to this in a memoir Till Death Don't Us Part: A True Story of Awakening to Love After Life, which was published by White Crow Books. It is described a true and transformational story of one woman's extraordinary journey from skepticism, through tragedy, into awakening to the knowledge that her dead fiancé is communicating from the hereafter. The story recounts McCarthy's change in focus and career path, and how she moved toward Spiritualism and writing about spirituality as a result of these experiences.

It was described by NYU Professor Ernest Rubeinstein as "a story that doesn't just save us from our fear of death but also from the vague uneasiness and sense of disconnection that sometimes infect a life." It does this by emphasizing the existential implications of continued existence for this life and how joy and purpose come from having an open mind, an open heart, the courage to heal, and from being willing to embrace and share the compassion offered us from the unseen world.

Feature article versions of the story appeared in the British magazine Psychic News and the politically progressive/liberal news magazine Salon.

Reception

In the first week of its release, Till Death Don't Us Part was ranked No. 1 New Release in its category on Amazon.

McCarthy appeared in various print media outlets, talking about the book, grief, consciousness, and awakening, including Forbes, The Irish Times, The Irish Voice  and Psychic News. She appeared on various radio shows and podcasts, including New Thinking Allowed with Jeffrey Mishlove, New Realities TV with Alan Steinfeld, Seek Reality with Roberta Grimes, Psychic Matters with Ann Theato, and Psychic Playdate with Melanie Alberts. She also gave lectures at the Edgar Cayce Center of New York and the Sir Arthur Conan Doyle Centre in Scotland.

The book was described by Academy Award® Nominee Juanita Wilson as "A gripping modern love story that transcends all boundaries." Peabody Award winner Alexandra Lipsitz was quoted as saying, "Her experiences made me believe in things I never thought I could believe in." Susan Shapiro, New York Times bestselling author of Unhooked & Byline Bible, wrote "It's a fascinating transformational journey that challenges all our assumptions about death." Author Jennifer Belle wrote, "A news reporter and former diehard skeptic, McCarthy gives us an entertaining, impeccably researched, and brilliantly written page-turner about continuing love after life, that will move, amaze, and provide deep comfort with its glorious, inspiring, and deafening ring of truth."

It also received favorable praise from Tricia J. Robertson, former President of the Society for Psychical Research, Minister David R Bruton MBA, President Spiritualists' National Union & Principal of the Arthur Findlay College, Nancy Eubel, former co-executive director of Association for Research and Enlightenment, and Victor and Wendy Zammit, co-authors of A Lawyer Presents the Evidence for the Afterlife.

Mediumship

After the transformation she experienced in 2010 after the death of her fiancé, the events described in Till Death Don't Us Part, and the revivification of an early childhood paranormal ability, McCarthy became an advocate of the ethical practice and healing potential of mediumship. She underwent years of intensive training at Arthur Findlay College, a school of Spiritualism and the psychic sciences. She holds three awards, Certificates of Recognition, in mediumship, spiritual healing and public speaking from its governing body, the Spiritualist National Union.

She has a private mediumship practice based between New York and Dublin. She continues to write about spirituality, bereavement, and metaphysical issues She offers private sessions in mediumship and healing to clients around the world, and she teaches mediumship development, healing, and inspirational writing with the Edgar Cayce Center of New York, Inner Spiritual Center, Montclair Metaphysical Center, and mentors students privately.

McCarthy is "passionate about giving voice to those in spirit to bring messages of joy, upliftment, and healing to loved ones still here in physical form. She is an advocate for palliative and afterlife education and how we can maintain relationships with those in spirit form in a healthy way." She has been interviewed by Carolan Carey on Society Bytes Radio, Peter Roth on Energy Stew on PRN Radio, and the Huffington Post about her work.

References

External links
 

1971 births
Living people
Alumni of the London School of Journalism
Alumni of University College Dublin
Journalists from Dublin (city)